Peace on Earth is a 1985 science fiction novel by Polish writer Stanisław Lem. The novel describes, in a satirical tone, the ultimate implications of the arms race. It is a continuation of the adventures of Ijon Tichy.

Plot summary
The evolution of artificial intelligence has allowed major world powers to sign a rather curious treaty: the Moon is divided into national zones (proportional to each nation's Earth real estate) and all weapons development and production must be moved there to be handled by factories. This is supposed to completely demilitarize Earth, achieving the long-sought dream of world peace. A MAD stabilizing factor is apparently preserved by the ability of countries, in case of war, to quickly ship weapons down from the Moon.

Unknown to most people, a problem arises. The ever-increasing amount of autonomy given to Moon's automata, in order to conduct more-effective espionage in neighbors' nation facilities and also to defend one's own, leads to localized robotic conflicts on the Moon's surface. Eventually, after a number of events, there is a total discontinuation of any communication with the Moon. After a number of failed expeditions to reveal the truth on what is going on beneath the Moon's surface, Ijon Tichy is called to the rescue.

Right before the return he was hit by a laser weapon which has led to his callosotomy. The resulting split personality leads to his inability to communicate properly both with the people and between the two "alter egos". This results in a good deal of slapstick comedy, e.g., involving hilarious conflicts between Tichy's left and right hand or leg. With the help of his friend, professor Tarantoga, he eventually succeeds in talking to himself.

Another consequence of Tichy's visit is that he accidentally brings to the Earth particles of mysterious moon dust, which turns out to be the result of military-robotic "necroevolution", described in Lem's novel The Invincible and which brings a quiet devastation of the whole Earth's technological infrastructure and information stored in it.

Publication history: first prints 

The first edition in Poland by Wydawnictwo Literackie was in 1987, 

The first Russian translation (Мир на Земле) was published in the literary magazine Звезда Востока in Uzbek SSR  in 1988, issues 9 and 10, translated by И. Левшин and К. Душенко. In book form it was published in the collection  Операция «Вечность» [Operation "Eternity"],  Mir Publishers, pp. 19-272  translated by Е. Вайсброт.

It was  translated into English in 1994.

Commentary
Lem wrote that contrary the impression, the book intention was not political fiction, but it was an attempt to envision a situation when two independent consciousnesses evolve in one brain. He explained that to this end he undertook an extensive study of professional literature and as a result the background of this plot element was 80% scientific and 20% fictional invention.

Wojciech Orliński notes that the novel is a fabularization of the ideas put forth in the Library of the 21st Century, Lem's faux review of the (non-existing) book  "Weapon Systems of The Twenty First Century or The Upside-down Evolution". In fact, in Chapter 2 Tichy reads this book.

 observes that the finale of the novel involving the destruction of information resembles the finales of several other Lem's novels: Professor A. Dońda, The Invincible, and Memoirs Found in a Bathtub.

References

External links
 

1985 novels
Novels by Stanisław Lem
1985 science fiction novels
Novels set on the Moon